Khuygan or Khuigan may refer to:
 Khuygan-e Olya
 Khuygan-e Sofla